Leptodactylus macrosternum is a species of frogs in the family Leptodactylidae. It is found in northern Argentina and adjacent eastern Bolivia, Paraguay, northern Uruguay, and southern and western Brazil. The specific name chaquensis refers to the area of Gran Chaco in Argentina. Common name Cei's white-lipped frog has been coined for it, although this particular species lacks the light upper lip stripe common in the genus.

Description
Adult males measure  and adult females  in snout–vent length. No light upper lip stripe is present. The dorsum and the flanks have several well-developed pairs of skin folds. Toes have lateral fringes.

Sexually active males have a pair of keratinized thumb spines. They have three distinct advertisement calls: growls, grunts, and trills, of which the first one is the most frequent.

Tadpoles of Gosner stage 36 measure  in total length.

Habitat and conservation
Leptodactylus macrosternum is a ground-dwelling species occurring near ponds and flooded areas at elevations below . The eggs are deposited in large foam nests over puddles and flooded areas in shallow water (<15 cm deep). Males call from the water's edge or from within the water.

This species is common and adapts well to anthropogenic disturbance. It is consumed as food in Argentina, which can lead to local declines. It occurs in several protected areas.

References

chaquensis
Amphibians of Argentina
Amphibians of Bolivia
Amphibians of Brazil
Amphibians of Paraguay
Amphibians of Uruguay
Taxa named by José Miguel Alfredo María Cei
Amphibians described in 1950
Taxonomy articles created by Polbot